Mansion House may refer to:

Great Britain and Ireland
 Mansion House, Dublin
 Mansion House, Hurstpierpoint, West Sussex
 Mansion House, London
 Mansion House tube station, on the London Underground
 Mansion House, Cardiff
 Mansion House, Doncaster, South Yorkshire
 Mansion House, Newport
 Mansion House, Swansea
 Mansion House, York, North Yorkshire
 The Mansion House, Old Warden Park, Bedfordshire

United States
 Joseph Smith Mansion House, Nauvoo, Illinois, a contributing property to the Nauvoo Historic District
 The Mansion House (Robbinston, Maine), listed on the National Register of Historic Places (NRHP)
 Mansion House (Public Landing, Maryland), NRHP-listed
 Mansion House (Trenton, New Jersey), NRHP-listed
 Mansion House (McDowell, Virginia), NRHP-listed
 Mathew H. Ritchey House, NRHP-listed and also known as Mansion House
 Mansion House at Culver Studios in Culver City, California

Other places
 Mansion House, Baguio, a summer retreat house of the President of the Philippines better known simply as The Mansion
 Mansion House, Kawau Island, house in New Zealand owned by Governor Grey

See also
 Mansion (disambiguation)